Digital Instrumentation Recorder is a magnetic tape data storage format developed by Sony.  It uses a ¾" wide tape, in a cassette with two reels, which is written and read with a helical scan process.

Generations

D1 
 Up to 64 MB/s data transfer speed
 Up to 96 GB data capacity
 ANSI ID-1 standard

External links
 Entry in Computer Desktop Encyclopedia

Computer storage tape media